Nicholas Clayton may refer to:

Nicholas J. Clayton (1840–1916), architect
Nicholas Clayton (cricketer) (1826–1867), Australian cricketer
Nicholas Clayton (divine) (1733–1797), English Presbyterian minister